Downhill Domination is a racing video game developed by Santa Monica Studio and Incognito Entertainment for the PlayStation 2. It was released in North America by Sony Computer Entertainment in 2003 and in Europe by Codemasters in 2004.

Gameplay
There are three options available at the main menu, single player, multiplayer and an options menu that allows players to modify gameplay elements such as difficulty and view unlocked items achieved during gameplay.

Initially, the player is introduced to six fictional racers displayed at the top of a mountain once single player mode is selected from the main menu of the game. By pressing the select button over an unlocked racer, additional info of the racer will be displayed, and by pressing the select button over a locked character which is represented by a statue, valuable info on how to unlock, the same will be displayed as a specific career to finish. In addition to two other fictional racers, players can also unlock real-life professional racers like Eric Carter, Tara Llanes, Brian Lopes, Richie Schley and Missy Giove when specific tournaments are finished during gameplay.

Combat is also integrated into the game, in which the player can use two buttons to attack other racers, one for a left attack, and the other for the right. These attacks can be upgraded to more powerful attacks by performing tricks, taking out opponents, or collecting power-ups (known in-game as "pickups"). A bike shop with several unlockable items to purchase is available but is only accessible in one player mode. Up to four players can play the game, but when playing with more than two, the available tracks and modes are limited.

Reception

Downhill Domination received "generally favorable reviews" according to the review aggregation website Metacritic. In Japan, where the game was ported for release on May 20, 2004 under the name , Famitsu gave it a score of 30 out of 40.

References

External links
 

2003 video games
Codemasters games
Cycling video games
Incognito Entertainment games
Multiplayer and single-player video games
PlayStation 2 games
PlayStation 2-only games
Racing video games
Santa Monica Studio games
Sony Interactive Entertainment games
Video games developed in the United States
Video games set in Hawaii
Sports video games set in Italy
Video games set in Japan
Video games set in Peru
Video games set in Russia
Video games set in Scotland
Video games set in Utah